Fatty acid oxidation inhibitors are a new potent class of drugs used in treatment of  stable angina pectoris and an addition in treatment of chronic heart failure.

Drugs
 CPT-I inhibitors: Etomoxir, Oxfenicine, Perhexiline  CPT-I (carnitine palmitoyl transferase) converts fatty acyl-CoA to fatty acyl-carnitine.
 Carnitine biosynthesis inhibitor: Mildronate
 3-KAT inhibitors: Trimetazidine  3-KAT (3-ketoacyl-coenzyme A thiolase) inhibitors directly inhibits fatty acid beta-oxidation.
 pFOX directly inhibits fatty acid beta-oxidation.

References

Drugs acting on the cardiovascular system